Miro Weinberger (born February 25, 1970) is an American politician and the 42nd and current mayor of Burlington, Vermont. He is the city's first Democratic Party mayor since Gordon Paquette was defeated by Bernie Sanders in 1981. Weinberger was the Democratic Party chair for Chittenden County during the 2004 election cycle. He also served on the Burlington Airport Commission for nine years, as board president of the Turning Point Center of Chittenden County, a drug addiction recovery organization, and on the board of the ECHO Lake Aquarium and Science Center, Leahy Center for Lake Champlain.

Weinberger won reelection in 2021 by less than 1 point against a Progressive Party candidate.

Early life 
Weinberger was born in Brattleboro, Vermont and raised in Hartland, Vermont, a member of a Jewish family. He left the state to attend Yale University, where he graduated with a double major in Environmental Studies and American Studies. Following his undergraduate studies, Weinberger worked in Washington, D.C. for Senator Patrick Leahy (D-VT) and on the reelection campaign for Senator Harris Wofford (D-PA). He also worked for non-profit housing developers Habitat for Humanity in Georgia, Florida, and New York, and completed a master's degree in Public Policy and Urban Planning from the Kennedy School of Government.

Professional career 
In 2002, Weinberger returned home to Vermont and co-founded the Hartland Group in Burlington. In less than nine years, his company built over 200 affordable and market rate homes in Vermont and New Hampshire, consisting of over $40 million of development. His work has won a smart growth and a green building award, LEED certifications, and has involved the clean-up of environmentally contaminated sites.

Weinberger's previous professional work included three and a half years with the Greyston Foundation, a community development organization in southwest Yonkers, and a short stint as a sports writing intern for the Boston Globe.

Mayor of Burlington 
Weinberger was elected mayor of Burlington on March 6, 2012.  In the election for mayor, Weinberger won the closely contested party primary against Tim Ashe and faced Republican Party opposition in the general election from Kurt Wright. Weinberger won final with 57.7% of the vote. He was re-elected to a second term on Tuesday, March 3, 2015, Town Meeting Day with 68% of the vote over former Burlington Public Works Director Steve Goodkind. On March 6, 2018, Weinberger defeated Carina Driscoll (I) (the stepdaughter of Bernie Sanders) and Infinite Culcleasure (I) in a highly publicized election to win his third term in office with 48% of the vote.

In his time in office, Weinberger has focused on mitigating Burlington's contributions to climate change, improving early learning opportunities for the youth, stewarding the City's financial health, leading initiatives to regulate Burlington's housing market, and combating the opioid epidemic.

The city of Burlington became the first city in the country to source 100 percent of its energy from renewable generation during Weinberger's tenure as mayor in 2014. Weinberger and his administration have set a goal of becoming a net zero energy city within the next 10–15 years. In coordination with the City's Electric Department, Weinberger has overseen an expansion in solar installations throughout Burlington – from 25 solar arrays pre-2012 to about 160 in 2017 – as well as in electric vehicle charging stations and electric vehicle purchasing incentives.

In mid 2021, Weinberger ordered the closure of the Sears Lane homeless encampment, displacing at least two residents, who filed an unsuccessful legal challenge to the decision.

As mayor, Weinberger spearheaded an initiative to redevelop Burlington's sole closed-interior mall into a mixed-use project. The original mall was demolished in 2017, but subsequent redevelopment stalled for years due to funding issues and a myriad of lawsuits against the project. Construction is set to resume in 2022.

Personal life 
Weinberger married Stacy Sherwat in 2000, and they have two daughters. Stacy is the Early Education Director at the King Street Center. Weinberger plays catcher for the Burlington Cardinals in an over-35 men's baseball league; former Boston Red Sox pitcher Bill Lee is also on the team.

References

External links 
 Burlington Mayor website
 Miro for Mayor campaign website

1970 births
21st-century American politicians
Jewish American people in Vermont politics
Jewish mayors of places in the United States
Harvard Kennedy School alumni
Living people
Mayors of Burlington, Vermont
People from Brattleboro, Vermont
People from Hartland, Vermont
Vermont Democrats
Yale University alumni
21st-century American Jews